Amra Ram (born 5 August 1955) is an Indian politician and peasant leader, who was the President of All India Kishan Sabha from July 2013 to October 2017. Currently he is the vice-president of All India Kishan Sabha since October 2017. He was a Member of Legislative Assembly (MLA) in Rajasthan Legislative Assembly from 1993 to 2013. Amra Ram is a member of the Communist Party of India (Marxist). Since 2014, he has been the State Secretary of CPI(M) Rajasthan unit and CEC member of CPI(M).

Early life Education and First Job 
Amra Ram was born into a farming family on 5 August 1955 to Rami Devi and Devi in Mundwara village, Sikar District, Rajasthan. He is the fourth child of seven siblings.  For schooling, he attended Govt. Primary School, Mundwara and Bajaj School, Kasi Ka Bas, Sikar, Govt. Shri Kalyan School, and Sikar for HSC. In 1973 Amra Ram joined Shri Kalyan Govt. College, there he studied for B.Sc. degree and in 1976 he went to Gorakhpur University, where he earned his Bachelor of Education (B.Ed.) degree. In 1979, he returned to Shri Kalyan Govt. College and earned his M.Com degree in EAFM subject.

Amra Ram participated in the sport of Kabbadi, playing for Rajasthan in the National Open Championship held in Simoga, Karnataka in 1971.

After completing the college, he started the job of a government teacher in 1982. During this, He taught at the Dhod and Nagawa School. Soon he left the job and actively joined activism and politics.

Students Politics 
While studying in college, he joined the Students Federation of India (SFI), the student organization of Communist Party of India (Marxist). He was elected Students Union President of Shri Kalyan Govt. College under the banner of SFI in 1979. At that time, Shri Kalyan Govt. College was the second largest college in Rajasthan on the basis of students strength. In the same year he was elected State Vice President of SFI's Rajasthan Unit.

Political career 
 Sarpanch, Grampanchayat Mundwara- Amra Ram was elected Sarpanch of Mundwada twice from 1983 to 1993.
 In 1985, he contested for the first time for the legislator on CPI(M) ticket, and stood third place with 10281 votes.
 In 1993, he was elected Legislative Assembly Member for the first time, by defeating Congress's Ramdev Singh in the Assembly elections from Dhod constituency of Rajasthan Assembly.
 He was elected legislator (MLA) for three consecutive terms in the year 1993, 1998, and 2003 from Dhod.
 In 2008, he was elected Legislative Assembly Member for fourth time, by defeating Congress's Narayan Singh in the Assembly elections from Danta Ramgarh constituency of Rajasthan Assembly. It was his fourth consecutive term in the Rajasthan Legislative Assembly on CPI(M) ticket.
 He lost the 2013 Assembly elections and stayed in third place, this time Narayan Singh of Congress won the seat.
 In 1996, he contested for the first time for Member of Parliament. He lost, receiving 56,452 votes in Sikar constituency of Lok Sabha (Lower house of Indian Parliament), trailing at third position behind Dr. Hari Singh (INC candidate, winner) and Subhash Maharia (BJP candidate).
 After 1996, he has contested for the Sikar Lok Sabha constituency seat 6 times but has not won.

Role in Vidhan Sabha 
He was elected to the Rajasthan Legislative Assembly for four terms. Amra Ram is known for bringing farmer issues to the notice of Assembly.
 Farmers were agitating on 20 January 1997 for power supply for wells outside the Rajasthan assembly, Amra raised this demand of farmers in the House and sought solution. However, this was not discussed before the Governor's address commenced. Amra Ram, however, disrupted the governor's address and insisted that if the assembly won't look after the well-being of the farmers, the assembly proceedings would/should be stopped. (Hindi: अमराराम ने कहा कि अगर किसान का कुआँ नहीं चलेगा तो विधानसभा भी नहीं चलेगी). For this incident, Amra Ram and 4 other MLAs were suspended from the assembly for 3 months. At that time Baliram Bhagat was the Governor and Bhairun Singh Shekhawat was the Chief Minister of Rajasthan.
 As an MLA, Amra Ram always opposed the proposals for the increase in wages and allowances of legislators.
 Amra Ram opposed the proposal of the Legislative Council in Rajasthan and demanded division of the house on the issue on 17 April 2012. He argued that doing so would give additional burden of Rs 500 crore annually to the people of the state. The proposal of the Legislative Council passed in the division of assembly by majority. Ruling Party and opposition were in favor of the proposal, Amra Ram and 4 other MLAs were against the proposal.

Movements

Sikar Kisan Movement 2017 

A large farmer's movement started in Rajasthan on 1 September 2017 to promote farmer's loan waivers, minimum support price and other demands under the leadership of Akhil Bhartiya Kishan Sabha (AIKS). Kisan Sabha, President, Amra Ram, Former MLA Pema Ram, Hetram Benwal, Pawan Duggal, Mangal Singh Yadav, Bhagirath Netar, Sagar Mal Khachariya and others were leading the movement. Sikar was the center of movement, so it is known as "Sikar Kisan Andolan". Thousands of farmers gathered in Sikar Mandhi on 1 September, and said their Padav would continue until demands were accepted. Kishan Padav (Hindi: किसान पड़ाव) continued in Sikar and Other Districts including Bikaner, Nagaur, Jhunjhunu, Churu, Hanumangarh, Shri Ganganagar, Alwar till 10 September. During this, government imposed Section 144 and also blocked Internet services in Sikar. When the demands were not accepted, on 10 September, AIKS called a Statewide Indefinite Highway Strike.  After beginning from Sikar, this movement spread throughout Rajasthan, it had a widespread impact in 14 districts. Meanwhile, Sikar and other cities were also kept under strike. Traders and many organizations supported the Farmer's Movement. On 11th day, on the call of the Kisan Sabha, the farmers blocked highways and all other major and minor roads. Then the government invited the delegation of farmers for the talks on 11 September. After 2 days long talk government buckled on 13 September night and accepted the demand of farmers. The movement was withdrawn after the demands were accepted.

References

External links
 Amra Ram on Twitter

Rajasthan MLAs 1998–2003
Rajasthan MLAs 2008–2013
Rajasthan MLAs 1993–1998
Rajasthan MLAs 2003–2008
1955 births
Living people
Communist Party of India (Marxist) politicians from Rajasthan